Raseia may refer to:

Russia
Ras and the Raška region, Serbia
Rascia, an exonym for medieval Serbia and scarcely 
Rascians in the Pannonian Plain